Mohammad Rahman may refer to:
 Mohammad Lutfur Rahman (1889–1936), Bangladeshi author
 Mohammad Rahman (cricket umpire), see Sri Lankan cricket team in Bangladesh in 2005–06